Liisa Ann Margaret Galea is a Canadian neuroscientist who is a professor of psychology at the University of British Columbia. She is a member of the Centre for Brain Health and Director of the Graduate Programme in Neuroscience. Her research considers the impact of hormones on brain health and behaviour.

Early life and education
Galea is of Estonian and Maltese heritage. Her mother, an accountant, escaped the Iron Curtain during World War II, first to Sweden and eventually to Canada. Galea grew up in Toronto. She studied psychology and engineering at Queen's University at Kingston. She moved to the University of Western Ontario (UWO) for her doctoral studies, where she investigated developmental and hormonal aspects of spatial learning. She was one of the first graduates of the doctoral degree in neuroscience at UWO. After completing her doctoral research Galea moved to the Rockefeller University as a postdoctoral research associate.

Research and career 
Galea's significant body of work has added to our knowledge of how circulating hormones and life events such as pregnancy and aging impact cognition.

Galea moved to the University of British Columbia as an Assistant Professor in 1997. She spent five years at UBC before moving to the University of Toronto as Associate Professor. Galea was appointed Associate Professor at UBC in 2003, where she was eventually was made full Professor and Director of the Graduate Programme in Neuroscience. Her research considers behavioural neuroscience, and the impact of hormones on brain health and function. Different to most neuroscientists, Galea studies the female brain.

In particular, Galea is interested in the neural consequences of stress, the impacts of pregnancy and mothering on memory, as well as the development of preclinical models for postpartum depression. She has shown that brain function improves in motherhood, with mothers scoring better in multi-tasking and memory tasks than those who have not given birth. Galea has advocated for the proper consideration of women's health in medical research. She serves as Editor-in-Chief of Frontiers in Neuroendocrinology.

Awards and honours 
 2009 Kavli Foundation Fellow
 2012 Association for Psychological Science James McKeen Cattell Fund Sabbatical Fellowship
 2015 Vancouver YWCA Women of Distinction Award
 2015 University of British Columbia Dean of Arts Faculty Research Award
 2018 NSERC Discovery Accelerator Supplement
 2019 Michael Smith Foundation for Health Research Award

Selected publications

Personal life 
Galea is married and has two children.

References 

Canadian neuroscientists
Living people
Year of birth missing (living people)
Academic staff of the University of British Columbia
Canadian people of Estonian descent
Canadian people of Maltese descent
Queen's University at Kingston alumni
University of Western Ontario alumni